The R551 is a Regional Route in South Africa.

Route
Its western terminus is the R553 in Evaton. From there it runs east to meet the R82 at a staggered junction in De Deur. It continues eastwards to form an interchange with the R59 highway at Meyerton. East of the town, it passes through the village of Henley on Klip then crosses the R557 before reaching its eastern terminus at an intersection with the R42 near Suikerbosrand Nature Reserve.

References

Regional Routes in Gauteng